The 2011 Championship 1 was a semi-professional rugby league football competition played in England and Wales, the third tier of the sport in the country. The winner of this league, along with the play-off winners will be promoted to the 2012 Rugby Football League Championship. There is no relegation from this league as it is the lowest tier of professional rugby league.

All of the teams competed in the 2011 Challenge Cup but the South Wales Scorpions did not compete in the 2011 National League Cup.

2011 structure

The competition features mainly the same teams as it did in 2010. The exceptions being that the Hunslet Hawks and the York City Knights were both promoted to compete in the 2011 RFL Championship. The Keighley Cougars and Whitehaven were relegated from the 2010 RFL Championship. The competition was to contain 11 teams, however, the Blackpool Panthers went into administration  and were thus omitted from the competition for 2011

Season table

Season Results

Round 1

Round 2

Round 3

Round 4

Round 5

Round 6

Round 7

Statistics
The following are the top points scorers in Championship 1 during the 2011 season. Statistics also include tries and goals scored in the play-offs.

See also
 Co-operative Championship
 2011 RFL Championship
 RFL League 1
 2011 National League Cup

Notes

References

External links
Official Championship website
RFL Championship coverage
Scores from Sky Sports
RugbyLeague.org Championship 1 Fans Forums

RFL League 1
Rugby Football League Championship
2011 in English rugby league
2011 in Welsh rugby league